Cuba Nostalgia is an annual three-day festival in Little Havana, a neighbourhood in Miami, Florida, where Cuban-Americans celebrate Cuba under the Batista dictatorship before it was liberated by the Castro. The festival has also hosted a database to reconnect those who were trafficked from Cuba as children during Operation Peter Pan.

References

External links
Cuba Nostalgia Official Site
A Quick Stop in Old Cuba
Cuba Nostalgia offers a slice of old Cuban culture

Cuban-American culture in Miami
Cultural festivals in the United States
Latin American festivals
Nostalgia in the United States